Kill the Lights may refer to:

Art
Kill the Lights!, a 2009 oil painting by Matthew Hindley

Music

Albums
 Kill the Lights (The New Cities album), 2011
 Kill the Lights (Luke Bryan album), 2015 (or its title song, see below)
 Kill the Lights Tour, a 2016 tour by Bryan to support the album
 Kill the Lights (Lowercase album), 1997

Songs
 "Kill the Lights" (Alex Newell, DJ Cassidy and Nile Rodgers song), 2016
 "Kill the Lights" (Britney Spears song), 2008
 "Kill the Lights", a 1999 song by Rancid, appearing on the 2008 album B Sides and C Sides
 "Kill the Lights", a 2006 song by Mojave 3 from Puzzles Like You
 "Kill the Lights", a 2007 song by The Birthday Massacre from Walking with Strangers
 "Kill the Lights", a 2010 song by David Usher from The Mile End Sessions
 "Kill the Lights", a 2010 song by Ryan Adams from the album III/IV
 "Kill the Lights", a 2012 song by Set It Off
 "Kill the Lights", a 2012 song by The-Dream, released ahead of the album IV Play
 "Kill the Lights", a 2013 song by Matt Nathanson from Last of the Great Pretenders
 "Kill the Lights", a 2013 song by Silverstein from This Is How the Wind Shifts
 "Kill the Lights", a 2014 song by Luke Bryan from Kill the Lights
 "Kill the Lights", a 2014 song by Radio Killer
 "Kill the Lights", a 2015 song by Abraham Mateo from AM

See also
"Kill the Light", a song by the band Kitten from the album Sunday School
"Kill the Light", a song by Lacuna Coil from the album Dark Adrenaline